Moshe Lobel is an American actor, filmmaker and musician. He is best known for starring in the Yiddish-Ukrainian drama SHTTL, which premiered at the London Film Festival and in competition at the Rome Film Festival.

Early life 
Lobel was raised in the insular Yiddish-speaking Hasidic community in Borough Park, Brooklyn. At age 12, he began to break away from his Hasidic roots, ultimately leaving the community entirely. He studied psychology at Yeshiva University, but switched his focus to theater, before leaving the school in his second year.

Career 
In 2017, Lobel made his Off-Broadway debut as Ralph in New Yiddish Rep's production of Awake and Sing! by Clifford Odets. In 2018, he made his television debut on HBO's High Maintenance. Later that year, he joined the cast of Fiddler on the Roof In Yiddish directed by Joel Grey, and appeared in The Vigil from Blumhouse.

With writer Etai Shuchatowitz, Lobel co-created, directed and starred in Untold Genius, a mockumentary series featuring Jackie Hoffman and Stephen Tobolowsky.

In 2021, he was cast as the lead in SHTTL, a Yiddish drama featuring Saul Rubinek. The film depicts the lives of a Jewish shtetl on the eve of Operation Barbarossa. It was filmed in Ukraine six months before the 2022 Russian invasion of Ukraine. The film premiered at the 2022 London Film Festival, and won the Audience Award one week later at the Rome Film Festival.

Filmography

References

External links 

 
 Moshe Lobel on BroadwayWorld
 Moshe Lobel on Instagram
 Moshe Lobel on Rotten Tomatoes

21st-century American male actors
Filmmakers from New York (state)
21st-century American male musicians
Jewish American male actors
Yiddish theatre performers
Yiddish film actors
Year of birth missing (living people)
Living people
People from Borough Park, Brooklyn
Musicians from Brooklyn
Yiddish-speaking people